Vehicle registration plates of the Channel Islands include:

 Vehicle registration plates of Jersey
Vehicle registration plates of the Bailiwick of Guernsey

Road transport in Jersey
Channel Islands